Fissicrambus intermedius is a moth in the family Crambidae. It was described by William D. Kearfott in 1908. It has been recorded from the US states of Arizona, California and Texas.

The wingspan is 16–20 mm. The forewings are dark ocherous above a median white streak and light ocherous below it as well as on the outer third. The hindwings are white in males and whitish gray in females. Adults are on wing from March to May and from August to October.

References

Crambini
Moths described in 1908
Moths of North America